Sorcery (known as Lord of Sorcery in Japan) is an action-adventure video game developed by Santa Monica Studio and The Workshop and published by Sony Computer Entertainment for PlayStation 3. It utilizes the PlayStation Move.

Plot
Players take the role of a young sorcerer's apprentice, named Finn, and must master the arcane arts in order to protect his homeland. The Nightmare Queen has broken the ancient pact with mankind and threatens to cover the land in eternal night, sending her foul minions across the land. Finn, together with the magical cat Erline, must travel through the dark Faerie Kingdoms to save the land from the darkness that has enshrouded it. The world is based on Irish mythology.

Gameplay

The game features 5 elemental spells (Earth, Ice, Fire, Wind and Lightning), as well as Finn's standard Arcane Bolt attack and context-sensitive spells such as Telekinesis. Also included are dozens of potions and numerous other items to collect. Players must defeat various enemies, solve puzzles and craft new potions as they progress through the game. Players must use the PlayStation Move to cast magic spells to attack enemies and brew elixirs. Players must journey throughout the Faerie Kingdom, recover ancient knowledge from the City of the Drowned and aid the local townsfolk.

Reception

Sorcery received "mixed or average" reviews, according to review aggregator Metacritic. Most reviews praise it for its great use of the PlayStation Move, and nice visual style. A common complaint is that the game has a length of 8 hours and lack of replay value.

References

External links
Sorcery at PlayStation.com

2012 video games
Action-adventure games
Fantasy video games
PlayStation 3 games
PlayStation 3-only games
PlayStation Move-compatible games
PlayStation Move-only games
Santa Monica Studio games
Single-player video games
Sony Interactive Entertainment games
Unreal Engine games
Video games about cats
Video games about magic
Video games based on Celtic mythology
Video games developed in the United States
Video games scored by Mark Mancina